Getúlio Vargas is a municipality in the state of Rio Grande do Sul, Brazil. With an estimated population of 16,184 people in 2020, it occupies an area of 286.6 km². The municipality was named after the Brazilian President of the same name.

See also
List of municipalities in Rio Grande do Sul

References

Municipalities in Rio Grande do Sul